The 1996–97 Premier Soccer League, known as the 1996–97 Castle Premiership for sponsorship purposes, was the first season of the newly established top-flight professional football league in South Africa. The league was an 18-team competition established in 1996 by Irvin Khoza, Kaizer Motaung, Raymond Hack and Jomo Sono in conjunction with the South African Football Association and it would run parallel to the European football calendar.

Season summary
Manning Rangers comfortably finished top of the log to win the first PSL title ahead of several more fancied opponents. The Mighty Maulers dominated to such an extent that they finished eight points clear of second-placed Kaizer Chiefs and a further two ahead of Orlando Pirates.

The Amakhosi had a more potent attack and a better defensive record than Rangers, and they lost fewer games, but their propensity to draw matches that they should have won cost them the trophy. It handed Gordon Igesund the first of four PSL titles that he would win in the competition and got South Africa's new top-flight league off to a noteworthy start.

Umtata Bush Bucks and Hellenic completed the top five, with Mamelodi Sundowns in sixth, Jomo Cosmos in seventh and Cape Town Spurs in eighth.

Popular clubs Bloemfontein Celtic and Moroka Swallows came in 10th and 11th respectively, while KwaZulu-Natal giants AmaZulu finished 14th on the 18-team log.

The first two teams to be relegated to the second tier from the PSL were Witbank Aces – who won just four games all season and finished with 19 points – and Michau Warriors. Real Rovers and Vaal Professionals (36 points each) finished a single point ahead of Warriors and avoided the demotion.

There was an abandoned game between Bloemfontein Celtic and Kaizer Chiefs on Sunday 16 February 1997. The game in Bloemfontein was called off in the 40th minute, with the home side trailing Chiefs 2-0, due to crowd trouble. Kaizer Chiefs were given the result along with 3 log points due to the trouble with the crowd being instigated by the Celtic fans. This was a rather surprising turn of events as the Celtic fans, while having a reputation for being extremely vocal and passionate, are not known to be unruly.

Final league table

See also
 Castle Lager

References

External links
RSSSF on PSL 96/97

1996-97
1996–97 in African association football leagues
1996–97 in South African soccer